Adrian Paul Grogan, OAM (born 6 July 1977) is an Australian Paralympic athlete.  He was born in the Sydney suburb of Parramatta, and has cerebral palsy. He won two bronze medals in the 200 m and 400 m events at the 1994 FESPIC Games in Beijing. He participated but did not win any medals at the 1996 Atlanta Paralympics. At the 2000 Sydney Paralympics, he won two gold medals in the Men's 4x100 m Relay T38 and Men's 4x400 m Relay T38 events, for which he received a Medal of the Order of Australia.

References

External links
 Adrian Grogan – Athletics Australia Results
 

Paralympic athletes of Australia
Athletes (track and field) at the 1996 Summer Paralympics
Athletes (track and field) at the 2000 Summer Paralympics
Medalists at the 2000 Summer Paralympics
Paralympic gold medalists for Australia
Recipients of the Medal of the Order of Australia
Athletes from Sydney
Cerebral Palsy category Paralympic competitors
Track and field athletes with cerebral palsy
1977 births
Living people
Paralympic medalists in athletics (track and field)
Medalists at the World Para Athletics Championships
FESPIC Games competitors
Australian male sprinters